The Railroad Fire was a wildfire that burned in between the communities of Sugar Pine and Fish Camp in the Sierra National Forest in California, United States. The fire was reported on August 29, 2017 and burned  before it was fully contained on October 24. It occurred during the historic 2011–2017 California drought. The cause of the fire remains unknown. 

The fire threatened communities in the area, historic buildings in the Nelder Grove Historic Area, Tenaya Lodge, and Yosemite Mountain Sugar Pine Railroad, which the fire was named after. It also impacted tourism and air quality in the forest and Yosemite National Park. It killed 39 out of the remaining 104 giant sequoias in Nelder Grove.

Timeline
The Railroad Fire was reported on August 29, 2017 in the area between the communities of Sugar Pine and Fish Camp the Sierra National Forest. The cause is unknown. On September 3, mandatory evacuations were ordered for the Sky Ranch Road area, due to the fire spreading towards residential areas after a storm, including the Cedar Valley Subdivision. On Labor Day crews wrapped historic structures in the Nelder Grove Historic Area, including cabins dating back to the late 1800s, in protective, heat-shielding material. 

As of September 7, Pacific Gas & Electric began working to re-establish electricity in the fire area and increased humidity overnight helped slow the fire. By September 10, the fire had burned  and was 70% contained, with 1,035 personnel fighting the fire. Crews were pulled from the fire lines on the evening of September 11 due to thunderstorms that brought a quarter inch of rain into the area. On October 24, the wildfire was fully contained.

Damage to Nelder Grove
The fire burned through much of Nelder Grove killing 38 of the grove's 92 monarch trees and forcing the permanent closure of The Shadow of the Giants trail.

Air quality
The air quality in the area has declined rapidly due to the fire, which is burning along with two others in the region. Yosemite National Park reported that air quality was "unhealthy" in the park as of September 6. Additionally, the US Forest Service reported that air quality was "hazardous" in Wawona. That same day, Yosemite High School released students early from school due to poor air quality.

Photo Gallery

See also
2017 California wildfires
Empire Fire
Mission Fire

References

External links
 

2017 California wildfires
History of Mariposa County, California
Wildfires in Mariposa County, California
August 2017 events in the United States
September 2017 events in the United States